Celyphus is a genus of beetle flies. It is known from the Oriental and Afrotropical realms. Up to 1859, all species of beetle flies were placed in this genus.

Description
Celyphus may be distinguished by the discal and second basal cell of the wing being distinct.

Species
C. abnormis Tenorio, 1972
C. bisetosus Malloch, 1929
C. cheni Shi, 1998
C. collaris Chen, 1949
C. dentis Shi, 1998
C. divisus Tenorio, 1972
C. eos Frey, 1941
C. forcipus Shi, 1998
C. fujianensis Shi, 1994
C. immitans Tenorio, 1972
C. lacunosus (Frey, 1941)
C. lobus Tenorio, 1972
C. maculis Shi, 1998
C. medogis Shi, 1998
C. microchaetus Shi, 1998
C. mirabilis Yang & Liu, 1998
C. nigritarsus Shi, 1998
C. nigrivittis Shi, 1998
C. obtectus Dalman, 1818
C. obtusus Frey, 1941
C. paradentatus (Papp, 2006)
C. pellucidus (Frey, 1941)
C. planitarsalis Shi, 1998
C. porosus Tenorio, 1972
C. pulchmaculatus Liu & Yang, 2002
C. puncticeps Malloch, 1929
C. quadrimaculatus Tenorio, 1972
C. resplendens (Frey, 1941)
C. reticulatus Tenorio, 1972
C. rugosus Tenorio, 1972
C. scutatus Wiedemann, 1830
C. testaceus Malloch, 1929
C. trichoporis Shi, 1998
C. unicolor (Frey, 1941)
C. violaceus (Chen, 1949)
C. vittalis Shi, 1998
C. xizanganus Yang & Liu, 1998

References

Celyphidae
Lauxanioidea genera
Diptera of Africa
Diptera of Asia